Ernest Hodkin (1890 – 1967) was an English footballer who played for Sunderland and Stoke.

Career
Hodkin was born in Alfreton and played for his works sides Clay Cross Works and Mansfield Mechanics before joining League side Sunderland in 1910. He played twice for the "Black Cats" in 1910–11 and at the end of the season left for Southern League side Stoke. He played five times in 1911–12 scoring once against Northampton Town and played 24 times in the 1912–13 relegation season. He then went on to play for Billingham, Shirebrook and Mansfield Mechanics.

Career statistics
Source:

References

English footballers
Mansfield Mechanics F.C. players
Sunderland A.F.C. players
Stoke City F.C. players
English Football League players
1890 births
1967 deaths
Association football wing halves